Astralium rhodostomum, common name the rosemouth star shell,  is a species of sea snail, a marine gastropod mollusk in the family Turbinidae, the turban snails.

Description
The length of the shell varies between 16 mm and 55 mm. This thick-shelled species stands near to Lithopoma caelatum (Gmelin, 1791), but is distinguished by the following characters: the whorls are flat, not arched, in the middle. The superior nodules are situated near to the suture. They are hemi-spherical and solid. The body whorl has but a single row of nodules. The carina is sharper, the base flatter, with only three concentric nodose lirae. The aperture is lower and more rhomboidal. The color pattern is reddish brown, more or less verging on violet.

Distribution
This species occurs in the Indo-West Pacific and off East India, the Philippines and Australia (Northern Territory, Queensland, Western Australia).

References

 Iredale,T. 1937. Middleton and Elizabeth Reef, South Pacific Ocean. The Australian Zoologist 8: 232-261
 Salvat, B. & Rives, C. 1975. Coquillages de Polynésie. Tahiti : Papeete les editions du pacifique, pp. 1–391.
 Wilson, B. 1993. Australian Marine Shells. Prosobranch Gastropods. Kallaroo, Western Australia : Odyssey Publishing Vol. 1 408 pp.
 Williams, S.T. (2007). Origins and diversification of Indo-West Pacific marine fauna: evolutionary history and biogeography of turban shells (Gastropoda, Turbinidae). Biological Journal of the Linnean Society, 2007, 92, 573–592
 Alf A. & Kreipl K. (2011) The family Turbinidae. Subfamilies Turbininae Rafinesque, 1815 and Prisogasterinae Hickman & McLean, 1990. In: G.T. Poppe & K. Groh (eds), A Conchological Iconography. Hackenheim: Conchbooks. pp. 1–82, pls 104–245.

External links

 

rhodostomum
Gastropods described in 1822